The MIAT College of Technology (formally Michigan Institute of Aviation and Technology) is a private for-profit technical school with locations in Canton, Michigan and Houston, Texas.  The college is a certified Federal Aviation Administration Part 147 school for aircraft maintenance that and also offers Energy Technology and Transportation Dispatch programs. The school was originally the Detroit Institute of Aeronautics, which was later renamed the Michigan Institute of Aeronautics. Around 2005, due to an increased demand for technical careers outside of aviation, the school expanded its curriculum to include Energy Technology and Global Logistics & Dispatch, and became known as the Michigan Institute of Aviation and Technology.

Accreditation, Certifications, and Approvals 
MIAT is accredited by the Accrediting Commission of Career Schools and Colleges, certified by the Federal Aviation Administration, and approved by the United States Department of Education, State of Michigan, and the Veteran Administration.

Additionally, the Houston campus of MIAT is approved and regulated by the Texas Workforce Commission, Career Schools and Colleges, Austin, Texas.

The Houston Campus was awarded ACCSC's School of Excellence Award for 2014.

MIAT was recognized each year from 2010 through 2016 as a G.I. Jobs Military Friendly School.  In 2015 MIAT was rated as a Gold level school by the Michigan Veterans Affairs Agency for its efforts in veteran friendly programs.

References

External links 
 

Aviation schools in the United States
Private universities and colleges in Michigan
Education in Wayne County, Michigan
Canton, Michigan